Claudia Țapardel (born 16 December 1983, in Bucharest, Romania) is a Romanian Member of the European Parliament for the Progressive Alliance of Socialists and Democrats (S&D). Elected in May 2014, she is currently one of the youngest MEPs in the European Parliament.

In the European Parliament, Ţapardel is a member of the Committee on Transport and Tourism, the Committee on Constitutional Affairs and the Delegation for relations with the countries of South Asia. She is a substitute member in the Committee on Budgets, the Parliamentary Delegation for relations with Mexico, and the Parliamentary Delegation for relations with Latin American countries. She is also co-chairperson of the European Parliament Intergroup on Tourism Development and Cultural Patrimony.

Education and training

Ţapardel is an economist, licensed in both Administrative Sciences (Academy of Economic Studies - Faculty of Public Administration and Management) and Banking Management (Romanian Banking Institute - School of Management, specializing in Finance - Banks). 

In April 2003 and April 2006 she obtained special awards at the Student Scientific and Communication Sessions.
 
She earned a PhD in Economics from the Academy of Economic Studies, specializing in management and strategic planning in local communities in Romania. 

She also holds a master's degree in International Business (from the Academy of Economic Studies, Faculty of International Economic Relations), a master's degree in International Conflict Analysis and Resolution (from the National School of Political Science and Public Administration, Department of International Relations and European Integration), and a master's degree in Public Management (from the "Ovidiu Şincai" Social Democratic Institute).

Political and professional experience

Ţapardel has been a member of the Social Democratic Party (PSD) since January 2002. She is currently serving as spokesperson for the Youth Organisation of the PSD (Social Democratic Youth).
 
She is vice-president of the Bucharest Organization of PSD and Vice President of the Young Social Democrats, with more attributions within the 3rd and 5th District Bucharest Organizations of PSD.

References

External links
 Claudia Tapardel profile on the European Parliament website
 Biography on Agerpres
 Biography on own website 

1983 births
Politicians from Bucharest
Bucharest Academy of Economic Studies alumni
Women MEPs for Romania
Social Democratic Party (Romania) MEPs
MEPs for Romania 2014–2019
Living people
21st-century Romanian politicians
National University of Political Studies and Public Administration alumni